Moose Lake (Lodge) Water Aerodrome  is located on Moose Lake, British Columbia, Canada.

See also
Moose Lake (Lodge) Airport

References

Seaplane bases in British Columbia
Regional District of Bulkley-Nechako
Registered aerodromes in British Columbia